"14" is a song by American singer Paula Cole, from her fourth studio album, Courage. It was released on April 3, 2007.

Background
"14" was released as the first single from her fourth studio album, Courage. The song consists of genres like rock. The song never entered the Billboard charts.

Track listing
 Digital download

"14" - 3:38

References

Paula Cole songs
2007 singles
Songs written by Patrick Leonard
Songs written by Paula Cole
2007 songs
Decca Records singles